Atifete Jahjaga (born 20 April 1975) is a Kosovar Albanian politician who served as the third President of Kosovo. She was the first female President of the Republic of Kosovo, the first non-partisan candidate and the youngest female head of state to be elected to the top office. She served as Deputy Director of the Kosovo Police, holding the rank of General Lieutenant Colonel, the most senior among women officers in Southeastern Europe.

Early life and education 
Jahjaga, a Kosovo Albanian, was born in Đakovica (now referred to as Gjakova), then a part of Socialist Federal Republic of Yugoslavia. Her paternal descent is from Berisha in northern Albania. She attended elementary and secondary school in Gjakova, and graduated from the University of Pristina at the Faculty of Law in 2000. In 2006/07, she completed a graduate and certificate program in police management and criminal law at the University of Leicester in the United Kingdom. She also received extensive professional training at the George C. Marshall European Centre for Security Studies in Germany and the FBI National Academy in the United States, and a postgraduate Certification in Crime Science at the University of Virginia in the U.S.A., in  2007.

Police career 
After the Kosovo War, Jahjaga completed Kosovo's Police Academy to become an officer and was gradually promoted to higher ranks, initially a major, then colonel, and finally major general, giving her contribution in building Kosovo's most trusted law enforcement institution.

Jahjaga held the position of the Deputy Director of the Kosovo Police, and briefly filled in as acting General Director in 2010. While serving in the Kosovo Police, she drew the attention of American officers and diplomats who presented her before senior U.S. officials on special occasions as a representative of a new generation of Kosovar civil servants. Her pictures with U.S. President George W. Bush during his visit to the FBI National Academy and with Secretary of State Hillary Clinton during her visit to Kosovo were among the few distributed through the Internet before she was placed on the national spotlight as a presidential candidate.

President of Kosovo 
Following a political crisis that engulfed Kosovo with the resignation of President Fatmir Sejdiu and after the Constitutional Court's decision which ruled against the election of Behgjet Pacolli as President of Kosovo, on 6 April 2011, due to her background in public service and highly demonstrated integrity, Atifete was announced as the consensus candidate for the office of President of Kosovo, under support from the Democratic Party of Kosovo, Democratic League of Kosovo and New Kosovo Alliance, and supported by the US Ambassador in Kosovo, Christopher Dell. Although she enjoyed a positive reputation as a police commander, she came out of relative obscurity as a candidate for the highest office of the state, with most of the public and political leaders unaware of her political leanings.

On 7 April, Jahjaga was elected President on the first round of voting by the Parliament; of 100 MPs present, 80 voted for Jahjaga and 10 cast a ballot for Suzan Novoberdali. To date, she is the only president to be elected on the first round of voting. Only Kosovo's 1st President Ibrahim Rugova has received more votes, being appointed by the Parliament by an 88-3 vote in 2002, in the third round of voting.

In her inaugural address, Jahjaga stated that her main goal as the President is to put Kosovo on a safe path toward membership into the European Union and the United Nations.

"The ideal of all Kosovo is membership in the EU and a permanent friendship with the United States. I believe and I am convinced our dreams will come true," she said in her first speech to the Parliament.

Presidency

Country image building

Since taking office in April 2011, President Jahjaga has sought to strengthen the democratic institutions of the country and has helped to build and to secure greater international recognition for Kosovo. Jahjaga has contributed to changing Kosovo’s image abroad, promoting European and Euro-Atlantic agenda, reconciliation and tolerance, normalization of relations with neighboring countries, and attracting foreign investment. She has redefined the role of the President in building pluralistic and democratic life of Kosovo, and continuously implemented the constitutional principles that form the basis of democracy. Through her participation in various international forums and numerous bilateral visits, Jahjaga has created new bridges of cooperation and gave her country a voice internationally by sharing Kosovo's state-building experience and making it a vital contributor in global debates. President Jahjaga's vision and her moderate leadership in Kosovo and the Western Balkans has secured her unprecedented international support.

Constitutional leadership
President Jahjaga actively enforced her constitutional duties and opposes legislation that contradicts European Union practices and standards. According to the European Commission Progress Report, her enforcement of checks and balances demonstrated that there is separation of powers in Kosovo presently.

In 2012, President Jahjaga sent back to the Parliament of Kosovo the Criminal Code for reconsideration, demanding the removal of provisions pertaining to freedom of expression, namely the criminalization of defamation and articles that would compel journalists to reveal their sources. Jahjaga deemed the measures in contradiction to freedom of expression, Constitution of the Republic of Kosovo and the European Convention on Human Rights.

During local elections of 2013 and early general elections of 2014, she successfully coordinated and mobilized mechanisms of justice and the Central Election Commission for a fair, democratic and transparent electoral process, following Kosovo's rigged general elections in 2010 that drew much concern about the legitimacy of Kosovo's institutions and criticism from international organizations. Due to the efforts led by Jahjaga to ensure a democratic process, according to international monitors, the elections of 2013 and 2014 were fair and inclusive, drawing to the ballot boxes for the first time the citizens of Serb municipalities in the north of the country. Following the June elections of 2014, Kosovo was paralyzed by a political and constitutional deadlock which prevented the formation of institutions and undermined the country's democratic functioning. In an effort to find solution to the political impasse, President Jahjaga began intensive meetings with leaders of parliamentary political parties in finding the formula for the establishment of the new Parliament and formation of the Government. Jahjaga played a crucial role in resolving the crisis, ensuring democratic functioning of institutions through a credible, transparent and inclusive process, in full respect of the constitutional court decisions and legal procedures. U.S. President Barack Obama, on the occasion of Kosovo's Independence Day, congratulated Jahjaga for her "leadership and resolve in working with party leaders during the extended government-formation process."

Immediately after the formation of the government, in coordination with the Speaker of the Parliament, Prime Minister, Deputy Prime Minister and Minister of Justice, Jahjaga reached institutional consensus on the establishment of the Special Court as an international obligation stemming from the exchange of letters between President Jahjaga and EU High Representative Baroness Ashton. The exchange of letters was approved with broad support of 87 votes in the Assembly of Kosovo. President Jahjaga during this process held regular meetings with opposition leaders, civil society and media to ensure transparency and to seek wider consensus on a national issue.

Determined to reach broader consensus on national agenda, Jahjaga established three National Councils during her mandate to ensure the inclusion of civil society, academia and business community. She spent much of her time in office meeting with representatives of civil society, ethnic communities and marginalized groups.

European integration process
President Jahjaga is very active in promoting the EU integration agenda of her country. In March 2012, she inaugurated the National Council for European Integration, a high level coordination body with the aim to build consensus on European agenda through an inclusive and cross-party approach. At its first meeting, President Jahjaga and EU Commissioner for Enlargement, Stefan Fule, launched the Feasibility Study for Stabilisation and Association Agreement between the Republic of Kosovo and the European Union. In 2013, the National Council adopted the first Kosovo National Strategy for European Integration, ensuring consensus with all Kosovar society actors involved in the process.

Jahjaga has consistently helped coordinate institutions efficiently and to accelerate the implementation of technical criteria as part of the Dialogue on visa liberalization with the European Union. In 2015, in coordination with other institutions, Jahjaga requested that all technical criteria to be completed by May 2015. A month later, Kosovo presented to the European Commission its final report on the fulfillment of the visa liberalization road map.

In early 2015, during the great wave of illegal migration of Kosovo citizens to western Europe, Jahjaga was the only leader who visited Kosovo municipalities affected by migration in order to speak with citizens about their concerns. Many European officials have commended Jahjaga for her personal engagement to establish direct dialogue with citizens and her key role in stopping the flow of the citizens of Kosovo to Western Europe.

Rule of law

President Jahjaga established the National Anti Corruption Council on 14 February 2012. The Council is a coordinating body that aims to coordinate the work and the activities of the institutions and independent agencies, to prevent and fight corruption. The Council is composed of representatives from different institutions and agencies and has become the key forum between these interlocutors. As the President guarantees the constitutional functioning of the institutions, Jahjaga has continuously sought to promote an independent and impartial justice system.

During the prolonged process of appointment of the State Prosecutor, the delays by the Prosecutorial Council, the decision of the Constitutional Court, as well as efforts to influence the process, President Jahjaga ensured a transparent and credible process acting on defined timelines and legal and constitutional procedures.

Jahjaga has also reformed the law on pardon by strengthening criteria and procedures for granting pardon to convicted persons. The new law rejects the practices of previous Presidents who have pardoned prisoners serving sentences for serious crimes. In order to ensure transparency and strengthen the rule of law, Jahjaga has pardoned a very small number of prisoners whereas in 2015 none. Ministry of Justice and the Council of Prisoners Strikers often criticized Jahjaga's decision to pardon a small number of prisoners who have committed lesser offenses.

Combating Islamic extremism and radicalization 

During the political deadlock of 2014, Kosovo was increasingly threatened by violent extremism as the number of Kosovo citizens joining the terrorist groups in the Middle East as foreign fighters was growing. Determined to stamp the flow of foreign fighters and address the security challenge they posed, President Jahjaga successfully led security mechanisms in the fight against violent extremism and radicalization, by turning Kosovo into an international example how to address a common challenge to national security.

In acknowledgement of her efforts, US President Obama invited President Jahjaga to attend the extraordinary session of the UN Security Council in September 2014, where the resolution was adopted to combat violent extremism and radicalization. President Jahjaga also had an important role in the adoption of the law to prevent citizens joining armed conflicts abroad, decreed on 23 March 2015, and measures for preventing the activities, organization and any radical and extremist activity in Kosovo. The United States and European Union have continuously praised Jahjaga for Kosovo's support for the international coalition against the Islamic State and strong commitment to combat terrorism and violent extremism.

Attracting foreign investments 
Jahjaga has been constantly engaged in creating new partnerships for Kosovo and attracting more foreign investments. In Kosovo, she called for a partnership and coordination of government and private sector to improve good business practices that would make Kosovo attractive to foreign investment.

President Jahjaga signed a 22 million euro donation of by Sheikha Bint Mubarak of United Arab Emirates for a Pediatric Surgical Hospital building within the University Clinical Center of Kosovo.

Women's empowerment

During her incumbency, women's role in Kosovo advanced. In 2012, she hosted an International Women's Summit "Partnership for Change—Empowering Women," which was attended by 200 leaders from Kosovo, wider Europe, North America, Africa and the Middle East. The discussions led to creation of the Pristina Principles, which affirm the rights of women to political participation and representation, economic resources and access to security and justice, and call for actions to make these principles a reality.

In May 2012 President Jahjaga became a member of the Council of Women World Leaders. She is participates in global conferences on the role of women in society.

Reconciliation and tolerance
Jahjaga worked hard to build bridges between Kosovo's various ethnic communities. She was active in interfaith dialogue and continuously reached out to minority communities in Kosovo. In 2013, she visited the Serb Orthodox Monastery of Dečani and its clergy for the celebration of Easter, calling on all the citizens of Kosovo 

to continue to cultivate the inter-religious tolerance that has prevailed in the country.

She led the Consultative Council for Communities. The Council made a number of recommendations pertaining to the empowerment of communities in various fields like education, economic development, employment, social and other issues. It repeatedly opposed the discriminatory policies towards communities.

Preventing sexual violence in conflict 
President Jahjaga has led institutional efforts to rehabilitate and reintegrate survivors of sexual violence during the conflict. In March 2014, President Jahjaga established the National Council for survivors of sexual violence during the war in Kosovo, a coordinating body consisting of representatives of key ministries, civil society and international partners, to provide legal remedies to survivors of sexual violence during war.

Under Atifete Jahjaga's influence, in June 2015 the Kosovo-born artist Alketa Xhafa-Mripa organized in Pristina an artistic installation "Thinking of you" to increase awareness and provide support to the survivors of this war crime. Thousands in Kosovo and abroad responded to the President's call to donate dresses in a sign of solidarity with survivors of sexual violence during the war. The echo of this work of art exceeded Kosovo, becoming a rallying cry to bring to an end this practice and seek justice for the victims. The event 
gained worldwide attention and was covered by all major world media, including the New York Times, Washington Post, The Guardian and dozens of international television.

Millennium Challenge Corporation 
Jahjaga led the efforts to make Kosovo an eligible country for the U.S. Government's Millennium Challenge Corporation (MCC) development funds. In February 2015, she created a working group led by the Office of the President of Kosovo and worked closely with national institutions and UN specialized agencies in Kosovo to improve policy performance on 20 independent and objective indicators on economic freedoms, democratic rights, control of corruption, good governance and investing in people. On 6 November 2015, the MCC announced that Kosovo has passed for the first time MCC scorecard with 13 out of 20 indicators, and improved Control of Corruption indicator with 16%, compared to previous year. At its quarterly meeting on 16 December 2015, the Millennium Challenge Corporation Board of Directors voted to make Kosovo eligible for a compact, MCC large-scale investment program.

Office of the President of Kosovo 

During Jahjaga's mandate, the Office of the President has always ranked as the most trusted institution by the citizens of Kosovo. As the first consensual and non-partisan President in history of independent Kosovo, Jahjaga was focused on de-politicization of the Office of the President which is open to all citizens and political parties. The role of the President is conceived as unique role in inter-institutional coordination which increases transparency and the effectiveness of the institutions to fulfill their mandate, and at the same time maintaining the constitutional separation of powers. Jahjaga lives a modest lifestyle. She and her cabinet have been singled out by the Anti-Corruption Agency as the best example of transparency and accountability that public officials should demonstrate. Jahjaga's Cabinet of Advisers consists of non-partisan and experienced professionals, educated at some of the best U.S. and European universities.

The Jahjaga Foundation 
The Jahjaga Foundation is a non-governmental organization, founded by Atifete Jahjaga in March 2018. The general goal of the Jahjaga Foundation is the democratic development of Kosovo and the Balkans, through social inclusion and support for marginalized groups, as a precondition for peacebuilding in the region.

Countries visited

Bilateral meetings with foreign officials

Honours and awards

Honours
 
  Two Sicilian Royal Family: Recipient of the Two Sicilian Royal Sacred Military Constantinian Order of Saint George Benemerenti Medal, 1st Class
  Two Sicilian Royal Family: Knight Grand Cross of the Royal Order of Francis I
 
Honorary citizen of Panama City

Awards
27 June 2013 - Honoris Causa from the University of Durham.

21 September 2014 - Leadership in Public Service Award from the Clinton Global Initiative.

16 July 2015 - Honorary degree of Doctor of Laws from the University of Leicester.

See also

Ismet Asllani

Notes

References

External links

Official website of The Jahjaga Foundation
Official website

1975 births
21st-century women politicians
Alumni of the University of Leicester
Female heads of state
Kosovo Albanians
Politicians from Gjakova
Kosovan women in politics
Living people
Presidents of Kosovo
Women presidents